Maitlands is one of the suburbs of Nelson, New Zealand. It lies to the east of Stoke, immediately to the west of Enner Glynn.

Geography

Maitlands covers an area of 0.77 km².

History

The estimated population of Maitlands reached 1,790 in 1996.

It reached 2,040 in 2001, 1,932 in 2006, 2,022 in 2013, and 2,148 in 2018.

Demography

Maitlands had a population of 2,148 at the 2018 New Zealand census, an increase of 126 people (6.2%) since the 2013 census, and an increase of 216 people (11.2%) since the 2006 census. There were 867 households. There were 1,029 males and 1,122 females, giving a sex ratio of 0.92 males per female. The median age was 41.5 years (compared with 37.4 years nationally), with 393 people (18.3%) aged under 15 years, 384 (17.9%) aged 15 to 29, 996 (46.4%) aged 30 to 64, and 375 (17.5%) aged 65 or older.

Ethnicities were 91.1% European/Pākehā, 10.3% Māori, 1.5% Pacific peoples, 5.4% Asian, and 2.1% other ethnicities (totals add to more than 100% since people could identify with multiple ethnicities).

The proportion of people born overseas was 18.9%, compared with 27.1% nationally.

Although some people objected to giving their religion, 58.2% had no religion, 30.4% were Christian, 0.7% were Hindu, 0.1% were Muslim, 0.6% were Buddhist and 2.4% had other religions.

Of those at least 15 years old, 357 (20.3%) people had a bachelor or higher degree, and 315 (17.9%) people had no formal qualifications. The median income was $31,300, compared with $31,800 nationally. The employment status of those at least 15 was that 864 (49.2%) people were employed full-time, 312 (17.8%) were part-time, and 45 (2.6%) were unemployed.

Economy

In 2018, 11.2% worked in manufacturing, 8.7% worked in construction, 5.6% worked in hospitality, 4.8% worked in transport, 8.7% worked in education, and 11.7% worked in healthcare.

Transport

As of 2018, among those who commuted to work, 73.5% drove a car, 2.8% rode in a car, 5.9% use a bike, and 5.9% walk or run.

No one used public transport.

References

Suburbs of Nelson, New Zealand
Populated places in the Nelson Region